Boherbue GAA is a Gaelic Athletic Association club founded in 1888 and based in the village of Boherbue in the north-west of County Cork, Ireland. The club plays Intermediate A football in the Cork County Championship.

Honours
 Cork Junior A Football Championship - Winners (1) 2021
Duhallow Junior A Football Championship - Winners (8) 1937, 1977, 1988, 2017, 2018, 2019, 2020, 2021
 Examiner/Ducon Cup - (12) 1946, 1949, 1966, 1988, 1989, 2001, 2014, 2015, 2016, 2017, 2018, 2019
 Cork Junior A Football League - 2014, 2018, 
 Cork Football League Junior A Division - 2014
 Nevin Cup - (6) 1962, 1968, 1971, 1976, 1978, 2015, 2018, 2021
 Duhallow Novice Football Championship - (1) 1976
 Duhallow Minor Football Championship - (7) 1936, 1964, 1984, 1985, 1998, 2008, 2016
 Duhallow Under-21 A Football Championship (2) 1987, 2016
 Duhallow Under-21 B Football Championship (1) 1987
Runners-up
 Cork Junior A Football Championship - Runners-up 2020
 Cork Premier 2 Minor Football Championship - Runners-up 2012

See also
 Duhallow GAA

References

External links
 Boherbue GAA Official Website
 Boherbue website

Gaelic games clubs in County Cork
Gaelic football clubs in County Cork